Five bids were initially submitted for the 2024 Summer Olympics. Following withdrawals, two bidding cities—Paris and Los Angeles—were left in the process. In July 2017, the IOC agreed to award the 2024 and 2028 Games simultaneously. Los Angeles agreed to bid for the 2028 Games, effectively ceding the 2024 Games to Paris.

Paris and Los Angeles were officially awarded the Games at the 131st IOC Session in Lima, Peru, on 13 September 2017.

Bidding process

2024 Games
The candidature process for the 2024 Games was announced at the same time as the names of the five candidate cities on 16 September 2015. The procedure consisted of three stages: Stage 1 – Vision, games concept and strategy; Stage 2 – Governance, legal and venue funding; and Stage 3 – Games delivery, experience and venue legacy.

Five candidate cities were announced by the International Olympic Committee on 16 September 2015: Budapest, Hamburg, Los Angeles, Paris and Rome. However, the process was hit by withdrawals, with political uncertainty and cost cited as deterring bidding cities. Hamburg withdrew its bid 29 November 2015 after holding a referendum. Rome withdrew on 21 September 2016 citing fiscal difficulties. On 22 February 2017, Budapest withdrew after a petition against the bid collected more signatures than necessary for a referendum.

Combined 2024 and 2028
On 30 March 2017, The IOC evaluation team concluded an initial two-day review of the rival proposals from Los Angeles and Paris. The IOC's evaluation commission praised both candidates for “creativity and strong legacy focus.”

With a view to securing the future of the Games in the context of withdrawals by two of the four cities that had bid for the 2022 Winter Olympics, and three of the five cities that had bid for the 2024 Games, on 3 April 2017 at the IOC convention in Denmark, Olympic officials met with bid committees from both cities to discuss the possibility of awarding Games to both, with one city hosting in 2024 and the other in 2028. While both cities appeared initially opposed to this compromise, Los Angeles had indicated that it would be willing to consider it if certain concessions were made after it was revealed that Paris was the "Favourite" for 2024.

The IOC Executive Board met in Lausanne, Switzerland to discuss the 2024 and 2028 bid processes on 9 June 2017. The International Olympic Committee formally proposed electing the 2024 and 2028 Olympic host cities at the same time at the next IOC meeting. The proposal was approved by an Extraordinary IOC Session on 11 July 2017 in Lausanne and presented to the IOC as a whole. The IOC set up a process where the LA 2024 bid committee, the Paris 2024 bid committee and the IOC would meet and discuss who would take which games and if it were possible. On 31 July 2017, Los Angeles announced it would withdraw from the 2024 bid race and bid exclusively for the 2028 games. Both Paris and Los Angeles bid committees displayed victory and satisfaction and welcomed the double hosting decision.

Bidding cities

Candidate cities

Non-selected bids

2024

Europe

United States 
On 19 February 2013, the United States Olympic Committee (USOC) sent letters to the mayors of 35 American cities to gauge their interest in hosting the 2024 Olympics. The cities included were Atlanta, Austin, Baltimore, Boston, Charlotte, Chicago, Columbus, Dallas, Denver, Detroit, Houston, Indianapolis, Jacksonville, Las Vegas, Los Angeles, Memphis, Miami, Minneapolis–Saint Paul, Nashville, New York City, Orlando, Philadelphia, Phoenix, Pittsburgh, Portland, Rochester, Sacramento, San Antonio, San Diego, San Francisco, San Jose, Seattle, St. Louis, Tulsa, and Washington, D.C.

On 10 June 2014, the USOC met in Boston to confirm the shortlist of cities drawn up for the 2024 Olympics. On 13 June 2014, the USOC announced its shortlist for potential host cities: Boston, Los Angeles, San Francisco, and Washington. On 26 September 2014, The U.S. Olympic Committee polled forty-seven of its sports federations, forty of which answered the poll, all answering positively to the question of whether the USOC should bid to host the 2024 Olympic games. On 1 December 2014 all four shortlisted cities Boston, Los Angeles, San Francisco, and Washington met the final deadline to submit their bid proposals prior to the USOC Board Meeting held on 16 December 2014 in Redwood City, California. During the closed door meeting each of the four cities were given two hours to present their city's bids. Following the final presentation, the USOC announced that the United States would bid to host the 2024 Olympic and Paralympic Games, but did not announce which city would bid. On 8 January 2015, the USOC selected Boston to be the candidate city from the United States but on 27 July 2015 Boston's bid was withdrawn and the USOC bid process was reopened. On 1 September 2015 the USOC announced that Los Angeles was chosen for the United States bid  for the 2024 Summer Games.

Proposed bids which did not go to application 

 Baku, Azerbaijan
Baku submitted a bid for the 2016 Summer Olympics and submitted a bid for the 2020 Summer Olympics. Baku failed to become a candidate both times. Upon failing to become a candidate for the 2020 Games, it was stated that Baku would "come back again next time even stronger". Baku was chosen to host the 2015 European Games and had already hosted the 2012 FIFA U-17 Women's World Cup and various other international competitions, such as the 2011 World Amateur Boxing Championships, the Eurovision Song Contest 2012, and the 2016 European Grand Prix.

 Istanbul, Turkey
In November 2013, Hasan Arat, who was the head of the Istanbul 2020 Olympic bid, vowed that the campaign to bring the Olympic Games to Turkey would continue and that the next bid will be the strongest yet: "We are now better equipped and major sports events and we have a greater understanding of Olympic Games". Istanbul had lost bids for the games in 2000, 2008, and 2020 to Sydney, Beijing, and Tokyo respectively, and also bid for the 2004 and 2012 Summer Olympics, but failed to become a candidate both times.

 Kyiv, Ukraine
In March 2010, Ukrainian Deputy Prime Minister Borys Kolesnikov stated that if Ukraine successfully co-hosted the UEFA Euro 2012 with Poland, it might place a bid for hosting the 2024 Summer Olympics. Kyiv was one of the host cities of UEFA Euro 2012 and was the city where the final match was held.

 Doha, Qatar
Doha bid to host the 2016 Summer Olympics, in addition to bidding for the 2020 Summer Olympics. If Doha were to host the games, the games would be held from 14 to 30 October, due to Qatar's hot summer temperatures. Additionally it would also be the first games held in the Middle East region. After Doha failed to become a candidate for the 2016 and 2020 Games, it was stated that Doha looks "forward to the 2024 race". Doha hosted the 2006 Asian Games and was the location of several stadiums used for the 2022 FIFA World Cup, which was held across Qatar.

 Nairobi, Kenya
In August 2012, Kenyan Prime Minister Raila Odinga announced that the capital city Nairobi was planning to bid for the 2032 games.

 Casablanca, Morocco
In March 2011, the Moroccan government confirmed that it would begin construction of an 80,000-seat stadium and will bid for the 2028 Summer Olympics instead of 2024.

 Madrid, Spain
Ana Botella, Mayor of Madrid, confirmed that the city will not take part in the competition for 2024 Olympic Games after three failed consecutive bids (2012, 2016 and 2020, losing to London, Rio de Janeiro and Tokyo respectively). Despite this, all sporting projects and infrastructure of the 2020 Olympic bid would be finished on the date scheduled.

 Malaysia &  Singapore
According to reports, a bid from Singapore and Malaysia was explored. Most likely, Kuala Lumpur and Singapore were to be the main cities. Malaysia bid in 2008, but failed to become a candidate. Kuala Lumpur received a 7.4 in transportation infrastructure, but nothing higher in any other category. Singapore was the host of the inaugural Youth Olympics in 2010 and the 117th IOC Session on July 6, 2005. Though previously not allowed by the Olympic Charter, recent changes have allowed multi-national bids. Despite this, it was acknowledged by the president of the Olympic council of Malaysia that it was too late to submit an Olympic bid for 2024, saying that the committees should focus on either the 2028 or 2032 games.

 Busan, South Korea
Postponed its plans to bid because Tokyo won the 2020 Games. The city hosted the 2002 Asian Games. The city decided to bid for the 2028 Summer Olympics instead. Pyeongchang hosted the 2018 Winter Olympics.

 Guadalajara, Mexico
On 31 March 2014 a political commission looking at the possibility of a Mexican bid for the 2024 Olympics concluded that there were no economic or infrastructure conditions in Mexico for a bid to take place.

 Various cities, United States
Aside from the three cities that were in consideration in the United States there were plans for an Olympic bid in a number of other cities:
San Francisco Bay Area
A San Francisco bid would likely have expanded to Oakland and other parts of the Bay Area for help in filling venue requirements such as indoor sports. Possible Bay Area venues included AT&T Park, Oracle Arena, Oakland Coliseum, SAP Center, Avaya Stadium, Levi's Stadium, and the projected Chase Center in San Francisco. Events could also have been held at area universities such as UC Berkeley's Haas Pavilion and Stanford Stadium. However, on 12 August 2015, it was announced that the Bay Area had pulled its bid.
Tulsa
Tulsa had been interested in bidding for the 2024 Olympic Games and was one of 35 cities to which the USOC had sent invitations. Following high-profile news reports in several national newspapers, city officials distanced themselves from the Tulsa 2024 Olympic Exploratory Committee and declined to bid. The committee was still seeking the bid as a private endeavor.
 New York City
On 14 May 2014, a report in The Financial Times claimed that New York governor Andrew Cuomo was seriously considering an Olympic bid for New York City, if his administration received a proposal for the games. According to the Financial Times source, talks were taking place between the Governor and New York City Mayor Bill de Blasio, and an advisory committee would likely be formed soon. However, de Blasio decided against the bid in late May.
Philadelphia
On 22 April 2013, Mayor Michael Nutter's office declared Philadelphia's interest in bidding for the 2024 Games. The city had expressed interest in hosting the 2016 Games, but lost out to Chicago as the USOC's bid city. The City of Philadelphia withdrew from consideration on 28 May 2014 in a letter to the USOC, citing "timing" as a major factor in the decision. The city reiterated a continued interest in pursuing the games in the future. On 28 May 2014, Mayor Michael Nutter announced that he had written to the USOC earlier that month, informing it of the city's decision not to pursue a bid to host the 2024 Summer Olympic Games.
Dallas
Dallas had planned to bid for the 2024 Games, but it was not selected by the USOC as one of the four potential host cities.
San Diego
After the multinational bid with Tijuana was rejected, San Diego had explored a possible bid for the 2024 Games without Tijuana. It was not selected by the USOC as one of the four potential host cities.

 Delhi, India
Indian Prime Minister Narendra Modi and IOC president Thomas Bach agreed during a meeting on 27 April 2015 in Delhi that 2024 is too early for India to bid for hosting an Olympics. Delhi has hosted the 1951 Asian Games, 1982 Asian Games and 2010 Commonwealth Games.

 Durban and Johannesburg, South Africa
While South Africa was seen as a likely bidder for the 2024 Olympic Games, events ended its hopes of hosting the games.  Due to Edmonton's decision to end its bid for the 2022 Commonwealth Games, Durban will host the games. South Africa's sports minister indicated on 1 March 2015 that the nation would focus on the Commonwealth Games instead of the Olympics.
Durban was removed as host of the 2022 Commonwealth Games on 13 March 2017 due to financial constraints.

 Brisbane and Melbourne, Australia
Australia, mainly Melbourne, had been seen as a likely bidder for the 2024 Summer Olympics. However, the head of the Australian Olympic Committee stated that Australia will focus on 2028 or 2032 instead of 2024. Melbourne hosted the 1956 Olympic Games and the 2006 Commonwealth Games and Brisbane hosted the 1982 Commonwealth Games. Queensland at the time was in the process of constructing and upgrading facilities in Brisbane and the Gold Coast for the 2018 Commonwealth Games.
Brisbane has been selected to host the 2032 Summer Olympics.

  Lima, Peru
In December 2013, the ex-president of the Peruvian Sports Institute (IPD), Arturo Woodman, declared that Lima should bid to host the Olympic Games in 2024. The city will host the 2019 Pan American Games. Akio Tamashiro, Affiliate Manager at IPD, stated that this would be the next target of the country, using the new infrastructure, experience and legacy of many sporting events as Lima 2019.

Due to the city winning the bid to host the 131st IOC Session in 2017, Lima cannot be a candidate city to host the 2024 Summer Olympics. On 22 January 2015, Lima lost its bid to host the World Games 2021 to Birmingham, Alabama.

 Saudi Arabia and  Bahrain
Saudi Arabia has published plans to bid to host the games together with Bahrain. All men's events would be held in Saudi Arabia and all women's events in Bahrain, because women are not allowed to participate in sports in Saudi Arabia. The IOC has dismissed the plans and said this gender split would not be allowed.

 Taipei, Chinese Taipei
Taiwan's capital and largest city may put in a bid in accordance with a campaign promise made by then-presidential candidate Ma Ying-jeou while he was running for president in 2008. It is seen as the culmination of a build-up in hosting sporting events for Taipei and the rest of Taiwan. Taipei hosted the 2009 Deaflympics and the 2017 Summer Universiade, while Kaohsiung hosted the 2009 World Games. In 2011, President Ma Ying-jeou stated again that Taiwan will bid for the 2024 Games. On 11 June 2014, the Sports Administration reported that it has no intention of bidding for the 2024 Olympic Games.

 Saint Petersburg, Russia
On 19 May 2014, Governor of Saint Petersburg Georgy Poltavchenko said that the city can apply for hosting the Olympic Games in 2024. According to him, St. Petersburg already has about 70% of the infrastructure needed for the Olympics. Also on 22 May 2014, Deputy Prime Minister of the Russian Federation Dmitry Kozak, who was responsible for holding the 2014 Winter Olympics, said that St. Petersburg had a good chance to win the right to host the Olympics in 2024. According to him, a lot of costs would not be required to prepare the city for the Olympics. Russia has not hosted the Summer Games since the 1980 Summer Olympics in Moscow, when it was part of the Soviet Union. On 6 May 2015, it was announced that Russia will focus on the 2018 World Cup and not a bid for the 2024 Summer Olympic Games. St. Petersburg is also preparing to host UEFA Euro 2020, where it will act as one of the venues. Russia will also host the 2019 Winter Universiade in the Siberian city of Krasnoyarsk.
Sochi
Dmitry Chernyshenko, the organizer of the 2014 Winter Olympics, says there is a huge potential in bringing the games back to Sochi. Beijing will be the first city to host a summer and winter games after it won the right to hold the 2022 Winter Olympics. Sochi would need to build many facilities to hold the games, although some indoor arenas from the Winter Olympics could conceivably be re-purposed. Sochi was the first Russian city to consider a bid for the 2024 Summer Olympics. Sochi's bid for the 2024 Summer Olympics was canceled on 31 July 2015.
 Toronto, Ontario, Canada
Toronto's economic development committee voted against bidding for the 2024 games on 20 January 2014, citing a bid would cost the city $50 to 60 million. Toronto's mayor at the time, Rob Ford, suggested that a bid for the 2028 games may be more realistic. Toronto bid for the 1996 and 2008 Summer Olympics (as well as undocumented failures to make final rounds for 1960, 1964 and 1976), but lost to Atlanta and Beijing, respectively. In 2009, Toronto won the bid for the 2015 Pan American Games. However, discussions to submit a 2024 Olympic bid were revived during the lead-up to the 2015 Pan American Games, with new philosophical changes announced for the bidding process by the IOC, “to actively promote the maximum use of existing facilities”, which means that venues built for the Pan Ams may not have met IOC requirements but they could be adapted to comply under the new approach, boosting Toronto's viability as a host city. International Olympic Committee President Thomas Bach was among those who, in light of the Pan American Games, stated that Toronto would be a good candidate.
On the CBC Radio One Toronto morning show Metro Morning on 10 July 2015, Mayor John Tory acknowledged that the city could revisit the idea of hosting the 2024 games, pending the results of the 2015 Pan American Games, and the financial viability, effectively reopening the possibility of a Toronto bid. On 11 August 2015, Tory met with the head of the Canadian Olympic Committee to discuss the bid process and the city's previous bids. The COC encouraged the mayor to consider bidding. On 11 September 2015, the COC held a conference about a potential bid and voted unanimously in support for a Toronto bid for the 2024 games. This vote  allowed the COC to prepare a letter of intent to send to the IOC by the September 15 deadline. On 15 September 2015, Mayor Tory announced that the city would not make a bid for the 2024 Summer Olympics.

2028 
Due to the change in the bidding process, no other cities had formally announced their candidacy for the 2028 Games when Los Angeles was announced as a candidate. 2028 Summer Olympics to the IOC's decision to award the 2028 games to Los Angeles:

 Toronto, Ontario, Canada
Toronto's economic development committee voted against bidding for the 2024 games on 20 January 2014, citing a bid would cost the city $50 to 60 million. Toronto's mayor at the time, Rob Ford, suggested that a bid for the 2028 games may be more realistic. Toronto bid for the 1996 and 2008 Summer Olympics (as well as undocumented failures to make final rounds for 1960, 1964 and 1976), but lost to Atlanta and Beijing, respectively. Interest in bidding for the 2024 Summer Olympics was rekindled during the 2015 Pan American Games in Toronto. Following the event, though, Toronto Mayor John Tory reaffirmed the decision not to submit a bid. Since the IOC traditionally doesn't award consecutive Summer Olympics to the same continent, Toronto may not be able to bid again until 2036.

 Guadalajara, Mexico
On 31 March 2014, a political commission looking at the possibility of a Mexican bid for the 2024 Olympics concluded that there were no economic or infrastructure conditions in Mexico for a bid to take place. However, a bid for the 2028 or 2032 Olympics might be a possibility. Of note, 2028 would mark the 60th anniversary of the 1968 Summer Olympics, which were held in Mexico City.

  Budapest, Hungary
"Budapest can present a credible, competitive application for hosting the 2028 Olympics", Zsolt Borkai, the president of the Hungarian Olympic Committee told Hungarian business daily Napi Gazdaság on 7 July 2014. A report announced that Budapest was planning to bid on the 2028 Summer Olympics and the 2024 Summer Olympics. He additionally stated that Budapest was going to host the 2017 European Youth Olympic Festival, which was going to be like a practice for the 2028 Summer Olympics. However, he also said that Budapest would need to solve serious concerns surrounding transportation and Olympics sports facilities.

On 25 October 2013, Attila Szalay-Berzeviczy, head of the Budapest Olympics Movement (BOM), made a statement that Budapest had a "realistic chance" of hosting the 2028 Summer Olympics, but said Budapest would focus on a bid for the 2024 Summer Olympics first as a practice bid. Szalay-Berzeviczy also stated that the facilities in Hungary, such as transportation and sports venues, required significant work in advance of hosting any Olympics.

In January 2017, a civil organization called Momentum Movement started a petition to have a referendum for Budapest residents if they want to organize the Summer Olympics in 2024 or not. Several opposition parties, such as Lehet Más a Politika (LMP), Együtt, Párbeszéd Magyarországért (PM), Magyar Szocialista Párt (MSZP) and Demokratikus Koalíció (DK) joined to the movement, as well as Magyar Kétfarkú Kutya Párt (MKKP), which also started a satiric poster campaign against the bid in February. Most of the opposition parties and civil organizations have criticized the government for the bid, accusing it with corruption and spending the money on the Olympic Games instead of developing health care, education and the transportation in Budapest. A total of 138,527 signatures is required to be collected from Budapestians until 17 February 2017 to start a referendum. The referendum would be held in Budapest and only the residents of the capital city would be able to cast a valid vote. If Budapest withdraws from the 2024 Olympic race, there could still be a chance for a 2028 bid. On 22 February 2017, Budapest withdrew its bid to host the 2024 Summer Olympics, leaving only Los Angeles and Paris in the race. However, Budapest's Olympic dreams are still alive-and-well and Budapest is considering a future bid for 2032 at the earliest.

 Germany
Berlin
The former mayor of Berlin, Klaus Wowereit, had stated that Berlin was exploring a bid for the 2024 or 2028 Olympic Games. Berlin hosted the 1936 Summer Olympics and last bid for the 2000 Summer Olympics, but was eliminated in the second round with the Olympics awarded to Sydney, Australia. As polls in Berlin showed, 55% of Berlin's population supported the application to host the 2024 Games. On 16 March 2015, the National Olympic Committee (DOSB) proposed Hamburg to be the candidate city from Germany for the 2024 Summer Olympics. However, on 29 November 2015, a referendum was held in which 51.6% of the citizens voted against a bid for the Olympics. Although this means that Germany was no longer in the running for hosting the 2024 Summer Olympics, Berlin could still bid to host the 2028 or 2032 Games, which would mark 96 years after they last hosted the Summer Olympics in 1936 and 60 years after Munich 1972.

Hamburg
 Hamburg planned to bid for the 2024 Summer Olympics, and if they failed, to re-bid again at 2028. On 16 March 2015, the German Olympic Sports Confederation (DOSB) chose Hamburg for the official bid for the International Olympic Committee. In November 2015, the city held a referendum on withdrawing the potential bid. Although a majority 51.6 percent of residents voted against bidding for the Games 2024, with critics of the plan saying expected cost was too high, a bid for the 2028 or 2032 games is still possible and also is the preferred solution of the DOSB for 2028 or 2032, which would mark 60 years after Munich 1972.

Rhine-Ruhr
In summer 2016, an Olympic bid for the Rhine-Ruhr metropolitan area was suggested. The area includes the Ruhr agglomeration and close-by large cities like Cologne, Düsseldorf, Dortmund and Essen. The bid would appeal to the new Olympic spirit of more regional, democratic and polycentric bids, fostering urban development. A high acceptance of 68 % among local citizens was reported by a Mentefactum survey in September 2016.

 Italy
Milan
Democratic Party's mayor of Milan, Giuseppe Sala, said that Milan could likely present a bid to host 2028 or 2032 Games in case Rome withdraws its candidature for the 2024 Olympics. Rome withdrew its 2024 Olympic Games bid on 21 September 2016. On 4 October 2016, Governor of Lombardy Region, Roberto Maroni, said he met CONI President, Giovanni Malagò, proposing Milan and its surrounding territories as Italian candidate city for 2028 Olympics, in the case that Los Angeles gets the 2024 Summer Olympics. The regional government would be ready to collaborate with the Italian National Olympic Committee. Milan was awarded the host city of the 2026 Winter Olympics with Cortina d'Ampezzo Milano-Cortina will host 2026 Winter Olympics.

Naples
 Mayor of Naples, Luigi De Magistris, said that the city is getting ready to be a likely candidate for the 2028 Olympics. The Olympic Summer Games would represent another major opportunity for Naples after having hosted 2019 Summer Universiade.

 Netherlands
Amsterdam 
Rotterdam
On 29 October 2012, the Dutch cabinet, which was newly formed in 2012, announced that the government would no longer be supporting for the 2028 Summer Olympics, and that they wanted "Ambitions to get Dutch sports on an Olympic level, but without getting the Olympic Games to the Netherlands". The Dutch government consisting of the People's Party for Freedom and Democracy (VVD) and the Labour Party (PvdA) agreed in a discussion that the games were not going to get support. On 13 April 2014, the possible postponement of The Netherlands to host the 2028 Summer Olympics was reconfirmed, as Henk Stokhof, head of the Department of Sports at the City of Amsterdam, said during the SportAccord International Convention in Belek that the possible Amsterdam bid for 2028 Olympics was 'cut short due to fears of the cost of the bid'. However, he also said that the bid could be revived later, which the bid could be decided whether or not it would be done in the future as far as 2019 or 2020.

Rotterdam was to be the alternative option of the Amsterdam bid in the 2028 Summer Olympics. But with the Amsterdam bid being postponed, Rotterdam was also postponed.

2028 would mark the 100th anniversary of the 1928 Summer Olympics, which were also hosted in the Dutch capital.

  Russia
Kazan
Kazan hosted the 2015 World Aquatics Championships and the 2013 Summer Universiade. It will also be one of the host cities for the 2018 World Cup. The city has dubbed itself the "sports capital of Russia." "The door is closing and the Russian Olympic Committee, as far as I know, has no intention to put in a bid for the 2024 summer games," said Popov. "I don't think Kazan will bid for '24 but maybe for the future, '28." A lot of infrastructure was built for past events. Russia last hosted the Summer Olympic Games in 1980, in Moscow, as the Soviet Union.

 Saint Petersburg
On 18 October 2013, Mikhail Radko, the leader of the group considering a possible 2024 Summer Olympics or 2028 Summer Olympics bid for Saint Petersburg told to Around the Rings (ATR) publication that the city is most likely going to bid for the 2024 Summer Olympics, but mentioned that the city may change to the 2028 bid for which it may have a better chance. Radko also wrote a letter to the public specifically mentioning about the 2028 Summer Olympics bid for Saint Petersburg, saying that the place was an 'open city' for the Olympics. However, St. Petersburg may be a likely candidate for 2032.

Sochi
Dmitry Chernyshenko, the organizer of the 2014 Winter Olympics, says there's a huge potential in bringing the games back to Sochi. He revealed that he wants Sochi to follow the example of Beijing which will be the first city to host a summer and winter games. Sochi would need to build many facilities to hold the games, although some indoor arenas from the Winter Olympics could conceivably be repurposed.

 Madrid, Spain
Manuela Carmena, Mayor of Madrid, confirmed that the city will not take part in the competition for 2024 Olympic Games after three failed consecutive bids (2012, 2016 and 2020, losing to London, Rio de Janeiro and Tokyo respectively). Despite this, all sporting projects and infrastructure of the 2020 Olympic bid would be finished on the date scheduled. However, Madrid could be a likely candidate for 2032, which would mark the 40th anniversary of the last time Spain hosted the Olympics in Barcelona in 1992.

  Busan, South Korea
On 6 October 2014, Suh Byung-Soo, the Mayor of Busan, has confirmed that the city will be planning to bid for the 2028 Summer Olympics, noting that the city has matured on its capacity for hosting global events, and that the city will announce its bid to the International Olympic Committee in 2020. The mayor also said that 2028 will mark the 40th anniversary of the 1988 Summer Olympics that were hosted in the South Korean capital city Seoul, and is the last Summer Olympics to be held in South Korea.

Busan had planned to bid for the 2020 Summer Olympics in 2005. However, because Pyeongchang, South Korea won the 2018 Winter Olympics in 2011, officials pushed the bid to 2024 Summer Olympics, believing that the bid would be too close to each other as the same country. But in 2013, with Tokyo, Japan being awarded the 2020 Summer Olympics and the games again being in East Asia, Busan further pushed their bid to 2028. Busan also had thought of bidding for the 2016 Summer Olympics, but the city dropped the idea because of Pyeongchang's bid for the 2014 winter games.

Officials in Busan said that the 2020 Summer Olympics in Tokyo would help boost tourism in Busan if they were to host the 2028 Summer Olympics, and also state that they have several existing venues that could be used. Incheon has stated that as they improve their status as a city, they could be able to handle a co-hosted Olympic Games, since they could re-use their sport facilities.

Busan hosted the 1997 East Asian Games, 2002 Asian Games, and acted as one of the venues for the 2002 FIFA World Cup. During the 1988 Summer Olympics hosted by Seoul, Busan was the site of the games' sailing (then yachting) events.

  Doha, Qatar
In February 2016, Thani Al-Kuwari, secretary-general of the Qatar Olympic Committee, said that the country would unquestionably bid on a future Olympics. AFP reported that at a sports conference in Doha Al-Kuwari said, “The vision and the target is to host one of the Olympics one day. So we are hoping to have one day, you never know, Maybe 2028.” Doha bid for the 2016 and 2020 Olympics, both times it failed to become a candidate. Qatar hosted the 2015 World Men's Handball Championship, the 2015 AIBA World Boxing Championships, the 2015 IPC Athletics World Championships and the 2022 FIFA World Cup, and will host the 2023 FINA World Aquatics Championships.

 Kuala Lumpur, Malaysia and  Singapore
Tunku Tan Sri Imran Tuanku Ja’afar, the president of Olympic Council of Malaysia have expressed his intention of having a dual host bid for 2028 or 2032. "Doing it all on our own may be beyond us but under the new Olympic reform agenda, the IOC allow twin bids. I do see a joint bid between Kuala Lumpur and Singapore in the future,” IOC president, Thomas Bach also have been reported of hoping the Olympics to be held in South-East Asia. Singapore National Olympic Council have been remarked that it was an "...interesting concept." Malaysia have since held a Commonwealth Games in 1998 while Singapore have held Youth Olympic Games in 2010. Both countries acknowledged that infrastructure is not a problem but lack of world class athletes and magnitude of the Games have been noted as problems of having a single host bid.

 Casablanca, Morocco
In March 2011, the Moroccan government confirmed that it would begin construction of an 80,000-seat stadium and would bid for the 2028 instead of 2024.

  Nairobi, Kenya 
A number of Kenyan officials including Ochilo Ayacko (former Minister of Sports to the former Prime Minister Raila Odinga) and the former Vice President Kalonzo Musyoka had stated that they had intentions to bring the 2028 Summer Olympics or the 2032 Summer Olympics to Kenya. To further their support, they had also appointed Moi International Sports Centre (MISC) in Kasarani, to take charge of the sport facilities in Kenya. The officials, however, also mentioned the considerable difficulties they were going to have to face with facilities and financing.

International Business also stated that both the 2024 Summer Olympics and the 2028 Summer Olympics Nairobi planned to bid on and the 2032 Summer Olympics Nairobi was planning to bid on will be 'a long shot', according to Ed Hula, the chief editor of Around the Rings.

  Johannesburg, South Africa
The Boston Globe reported on 11 January 2015 that Johannesburg was continuing with their bid for the 2028 Summer Games. Johannesburg hosted the 2010 FIFA World Cup Final, and South Africa unsuccessfully bid for the 2004 Summer Olympics, which were awarded to Athens.

  Buenos Aires, Argentina
Buenos Aires bid to host the 2018 Summer Youth Olympics. It was stated that the successful bid could lead to a bid for the 2028 or 2032 Summer Olympic Games. The city also hosted the 125th IOC Session in 2013. Rio de Janeiro staged the first Summer Olympic Games in South America in 2016. Buenos Aires could potentially be the second city on the continent to stage the event. Buenos Aires bid to host the 1936, 1956, 1968, and 2004 Summer Olympics, but lost to Berlin, Melbourne, Mexico City and Athens respectively. On 4 July 2013, Buenos Aires was elected as the host city of the 2018 Summer Youth Olympics. In July 2016, Thomas Bach, president of the International Olympic Committee, said that "Buenos Aires is able to present a successful bid for 2028 or 2032". In January 2017, the Argentine Olympic Committee presented Buenos Aires as candidate to host the 2023 Pan American Games. Buenos Aires will compete with the city of Santiago de Chile.

  Australia
 Brisbane, Queensland
Brisbane considered a bid for the 2032 Summer Olympics. The city had the backing of the AOC and had support from IOC vice president John Coates. The city hosted the 1982 Commonwealth Games, the 2001 Goodwill Games and the annual Brisbane International and State of Origin. Brisbane made a bid to host the 1992 Olympics, however they were awarded to Barcelona.
On 22 August 2016, Brisbane consented to provide $870k to conduct a year-long Olympics feasibility study.
On 21 July 2021, Brisbane was selected by the International Olympic Committee to host the 2032 Summer Olympics.

South East Queensland considered a bid for 2032 Summer Olympics.
Olympic Study for 2032 Summer Olympics for Brisbane.

 Melbourne, Victoria
The former Premier of Victoria, Denis Napthine, backed a potential bid from Melbourne for the 2028 Summer Olympics. Melbourne hosted the 1956 Summer Olympics and the 2006 Commonwealth Games, and Australia hosted the 2000 Summer Olympics in Sydney. Melbourne had also unsuccessfully bid for the 1996 Summer Olympics, which were awarded to Atlanta in 1990. The AOC and IOC have preferenced Brisbane as being the next candidate city, however Melbourne would bid should Brisbane pull out of the race. If Brisbane bid and failed then Melbourne would move forward with a 2032 Olympics bid. Discussion has also raised the possibility of a joint Australia bid, staging the main event in Melbourne whilst co-hosting some outdoor events in Brisbane and Perth.

References

 
 
Summer Olympics bids
2017 in Peru
September 2017 events in South America
Events in Lima